| tries = 78
| top point scorer = 
| top try scorer = 
| Player of the tournament =
| website = 
| previous year = 2019–20
| previous tournament = 2019–20 Rugby Europe Trophy
| next year = 2022–23
| next tournament = 2022–23 Rugby Europe Trophy
}}
The 2021–22 Rugby Europe Trophy is the fifth season of the second premier rugby union competition for European national teams outside the Six Nations Championship which itself is a part of the Rugby Europe International Championships. The confirmed teams that are competing include  Belgium, Germany, Lithuania, Poland, Switzerland and Ukraine.

Participants

Table

Fixtures

See also
 Rugby Europe International Championships
 Six Nations Championship

References

External links
 Rugby Europe - Official Site

2021–22 Rugby Europe International Championships
Rugby Europe Trophy